GURPS Dinosaurs is a supplement by Stephen Dedman, published by Steve Jackson Games in 1996 for GURPS (Generic Universal Role-Playing System).

Description
GURPS Dinosaurs describes dinosaurs and Earth through prehistoric geological ages. Chapters include descriptions of the climatic conditions and creatures of each geological age:
 "Timeline" : an overview.
 "Paleozoic" 
 "Triassic" 
 "Jurassic" 
 "Cretaceous" 
 "Rise of The Mammals" : Beginning of the Tertiary era (from Paleocene to Miocene).
 "Pliocene and Pleistocene" : 
 "The First Humans" : the predecessors of homo sapiens, as well as the first humans and their civilizations.
 "Ice Age Characters" : Suggestions for the creation of prehistoric characters, as well as Shamanism and prehistoric equipment.
 "Prehistoric Campaigns"

Publication history
GURPS Dinosaurs is a 128-page softcover book designed by Stephen Dedman, with additional material by Kirk Tate, interior art by Scott Cooper, Russel Hawley, and Pat Ortega, and cover art by Paul Koroshetz. It was published by Steve Jackson Games in 1996. 

In the 2014 book Designers & Dragons: The '80s, game historian Shannon Appelcline noted that Steve Jackson Games decided in the early 1990s to stop publishing adventures, and as a result "SJG was now putting out standalone GURPS books rather than the more complex tiered book lines. This included more historical subgenre books. Some, such as GURPS Camelot (1991) and GURPS China (1991), were clearly sub-subgenres, while others like GURPS Old West (1991) and GURPS Middle Ages I (1992) covered genres notably missing before this point."

Reception
In the December 1997 edition of Dragon (Issue #242), Rick Swan was ambivalent about this book, noting "As a reality-based reference, GURPS Dinosaurs scores high, cataloging literally hundreds of prehistoric creatures in remarkable detail." But Swan didn't think the book went beyond basic descriptions, commenting, "when it comes to putting all this together in a campaign, GURPS Dinosaurs pretty much leaves you on your own. There’s a ton of hard data, but not much about roleplaying; that is, we’re told a lot about what dinosaurs look like, but darn little about how they behave." He also thought the included scenarios were "too skimpy", and the book lacked sufficient illustrations. Swan concluded by giving the book an average rating of 4 out of 6, saying, "GURPS Dinosaurs is good as far as it goes; it just doesn’t go far enough."

Reviews
Arcane #13

References

Dinosaurs
Role-playing game supplements introduced in 1996